Sem Lenço, sem Documento is a Brazilian telenovela produced and broadcast by Rede Globo. It premiered on 13 September 1977 and ended on 4 March 1978, with a total of 149 episodes. It is the twentieth "novela das sete" to be aired at the timeslot. It is created by  Mário Prata and directed by Régis Cardoso with Dennis Carvalho.

Cast

References

External links 
 

1977 telenovelas
TV Globo telenovelas
Brazilian telenovelas
1977 Brazilian television series debuts
1978 Brazilian television series endings
Portuguese-language telenovelas